Marinus of Caesarea was a Roman soldier and a Christian martyr.

Life
A soldier in a Roman legion, Marinus was promoted to the position of centurion. Before he was able to assume the post, a rival claimed that before a centurion could accept the post, he was to offer a sacrifice to the emperor, according to ancient law. Marinus, who until that point was a secret Christian, professed his true faith, and explained that it prevented him from offering this sacrifice. Marinus was then given three hours to change his decision. He went to a local church to speak with the bishop, who went by the name of Theotecnus. After meditating on the Gospels, Marinus returned to the legion and refused to make the sacrifice. He was then beheaded.

After his death
The remains of Marinus were buried by a Roman senator, St Asterius of Caesarea. Both saints have their feast day commemorated on March 3 in Catholicism.

References

262 deaths
Saints from the Holy Land
3rd-century Christian martyrs
Year of birth unknown
Military saints
Christian martyrs